Garugu-billi is a village in Parvathipuram Manyam district of the Indian state of Andhra Pradesh, India.

Demography
Garugubilli mandal had a population of 50,690 in 2001: 25,388 male and 25,302 female. The average literacy rate is 54%. Male literacy rate is 68% and that of females is 39%.

References 

Villages in Parvathipuram Manyam district